The Christian Democracy (DC) is a Christian democratic political party in Brazil. It was founded on March 30, 1995 as the Christian Social Democratic Party (PSDC), elected mayors and council members in 1996, and was officially registered on the Superior Electoral Court on August 5, 1997. It uses the TSE Identification Number 27.

At the legislative elections, 6 October 2002, the party won 1 out of 513 seats in the Chamber of Deputies and no seats in the Senate. The party lost all representation in the Congress in the 2006 elections.

On 3 August 2017, the party changed its name to the current Christian Democracy.

Electoral history

Presidential elections

Legislative elections

References

External links

Christian democratic parties in South America
Political parties established in 1995
1995 establishments in Brazil
Conservative parties in Brazil